Robert Coble may refer to:

 Bob Coble (born 1953), former mayor of Columbia, South Carolina
 Robert L. Coble (1928–1992), American ceramic scientist